The 2022–23 Eerste Divisie, known as Keuken Kampioen Divisie for sponsorship reasons, will be the 67th season of Eerste Divisie since its establishment in 1956.

Teams 
A total of 20 teams will take part in the league: 17 teams from the 2021–22 Eerste Divisie and 3 teams relegated from the 2021–22 Eredivisie.

Stadiums and locations

Number of teams by provinces

Personnel

Managerial changes

Standings

League table

Period tables

Period 1

Period 2

Period 3

Period 4

Results

Fixtures and results

Results by round

Statistics

Top scorers

Top assists

Clean sheets

Discipline

Player
 Most yellow cards: 9
  Alexander Büttner (De Graafschap)
 Most red cards: 2
  Collin Seedorf (Eindhoven)
  Charles-Andreas Brym (Eindhoven)

Club
 Most yellow cards: 62
 Dordrecht
 Most red cards: 6
 Eindhoven
 ADO Den Haag

References 

Eerste Divisie seasons
2
Netherlands
Current association football seasons